A simplicial map (also called simplicial mapping) is a function between two simplicial complexes, with the property that the images of the vertices of a simplex always span a simplex. Simplicial maps can be used to approximate continuous functions between topological spaces that can be triangulated; this is formalized by the simplicial approximation theorem. 

A simplicial isomorphism is a bijective simplicial map such that both it and its inverse are simplicial.

Definitions 
A simplicial map is defined in slightly different ways in different contexts.

Abstract simplicial complexes 
Let K and L be two abstract simplicial complexes (ASC). A simplicial map of K into L is a function from the vertices of K to the vertices of L, that maps every simplex in K to a simplex in L. That is, for any , . As an example, let K be ASC containing the sets {1,2},{2,3},{3,1} and their subsets, and let L be the ASC containing the set {4,5,6} and its subsets. Define a mapping f by:  f(1)=f(2)=4, f(3)=5. Then f is a simplicial mapping, since f({1,2})={4} which is a simplex in L, f({2,3})=f({3,1})={4,5} which is also a simplex in L, etc.

If  is not bijective, it may map k-dimensional simplices in K to l-dimensional simplices in L, for any l ≤ k. In the above example, f maps the one-dimensional simplex {1,2} to the zero-dimensional simplex {4}.

If  is bijective, and its inverse  is a simplicial map of L into K, then  is called a simplicial isomorphism. Isomorphic simplicial complexes are essentially "the same", up ro a renaming of the vertices. The function f defined above is not an isomorphism since it is not bijective. If we modify the definition to  f(1)=4, f(2)=5, f(3)=6, then f is bijective but it is still not an isomorphism, since  is not simplicial: , which is not a simplex in K. If we modify L by removing {4,5,6}, that is, L is the ASC containing only the sets {4,5},{5,6},{6,4} and their subsets, then f is an isomorphism.

Geometric simplicial complexes 
Let K and L be two geometric simplicial complexes (GSC). A simplicial map of K into L is a function  such that the images of the vertices of a simplex in K span a simplex in L. That is, for any simplex ,  . Note that this implies that vertices of K are mapped to vertices of L. 

Every simplicial map is continuous.

Simplicial maps are determined by their effects on vertices. In particular, there are a finite number of simplicial maps between two given finite simplicial complexes. 

A simplicial map between two ASCs induces a simplicial map between their geometric realizations (their underlying polyhedra) using barycentric coordinates. This can be defined precisely. Let K, L be to ASCs, and let  be a simplicial map. We define . This |f| is a simplicial map of |K| into |L|; it is a continuous function. If f is injective, then |f| is injective; if f is an isomorphism between K and L, then |f| is a homeomorphism between |K| and |L|.

Simplicial approximation
Let  be a continuous map between the underlying polyhedra of simplicial complexes and let us write  for the star of a vertex.

A simplicial approximation is homotopic to the map it approximates. See simplicial approximation theorem for more details.

Piecewise-linear maps 
Let K and L be two GSCs. A function  is called piecewise-linear (PL) if there exist a subdivision K' of K, and a subdivision L' of L, such that  is a simplicial map of K' into L'. Every simplicial map is PL, but the opposite is not true. For example, suppose |K| and |L| are two triangles, and let  be a non-linear function that maps the leftmost half of |K| linearly into the leftmost half of |L|, and maps the rightmost half of |K| linearly into the rightmostt half of |L|. Then f is PL, since it is a simplicial map between a subdivision of |K| into two triangles and a subdivision of |L| into two triangles. This notion is an adaptation of the general notion of a piecewise-linear function to simplicial complexes.

A PL homeomorphism between two polyhedra |K| and |L| is a PL mapping such that the simplicial mapping between the subdivisions, is a homeomorphism.

References

Algebraic topology
Simplicial homology
Simplicial sets